Nueng Dao Fa Diao is a 2018 Thai television drama adapted from the novel of the same name authored by Wannawat, who also wrote Kha Bodin, which was adapted into drama in 2015. Portraying the historical events during the war of 1765–67 between Ayutthaya and Konbaung Burma, the drama starred Jirayu Tangsrisuk and Natapohn Tameeruks amongst others and was originally aired on Channel 3 from 25 April to 20 June 2018.

Cast

 Khan Thong and friends

 Jirayu Tangsrisuk as Khan Thong ("Golden Bowl"), later Ok-luang Si Khanthin, Ok-phra Si Khanthin (Khan Thong), and Phra Si Satcha, respectively, disguised as a eunuch and entered the royal court of Ayutthaya for a secret mission
 Thakrit Tawanpong as Naen, later Khun Chit Chai Phak, friend of Khan Thong, later executed in lieu of Khan Thong

 Maeng Mao and family
 Natapohn Tameeruks as Maeng Mao ("Alate"), citizen of Ayutthaya, named after Princess Maeng Mao
 Montri Jenaksorn as Squire Ming, father of Maeng Mao
 Danai Charuchinda as Muang, elder brother of Maeng Mao
 Morrakot Hathaiwasiwong as In, wife of Muang
 Pechrada Tiempech as Chuen, younger sister of Muang

 Royal harem of Ayutthaya
 Chintara Sukapatana as Princess Maeng Mao, later Krommakhun Wimon Phakdi, queen consort of King Suriyat Amarin
 Nattarika Thammapridanant as Phen, concubine of King Suriyat Amarin
 Khwanruedi Glomglorm as Amphan, concubine of King Suriyat Amarin
 Amonlada Chaidech as Pao, servant of Princess Maeng Mao
 Prattana Banchongsang as Khunthao So-pha, governess
 Tarinda Kannasoot as Khunthao Salika, governess, mother of Khan Thong

 Nobility of Ayutthaya
 Atichat Chumnanont as Phraya Tak, governor of Tak, later King Taksin of Thon Buri
 Jirayu Tantrakul as Luang Phichai Asa, confident of Phraya Tak
 Vatcharachai Sunthornsiri as Phan Han, soldier under Phraya Tak
 Suriyont Arunwattakul as Phraya Kamhaeng, later Ok-ya Wang
 Jakkrit Ammarat as Phraya Phonlathep, acting as a spy for Burma
 Kosintr Ratchagrom as Phoem, later Cha-muen Si Sorarak, younger brother of Concubine Phen
 Nirud Saosudchard as Khun Phlaeng Rit
 Suchao Pongwilai as Ok-phra Racha Khan, chief eunuch
 Bhasakorn Bunyaworamethi as Ok-luang Si Mano Rat
 Nipat Charoenphol as Khun Rak Thewa
 Thanapol Preechapat as Khun Thep Chamnan
 Nattapon Wirayachai as Khun Thep Raksa
 Adisron Attakrit as Phraya Chanthabun, governor of Chanthabun
 Veyn Folconer as Phraya Siharat Decha
 Rajchawat Klibngoen as Phraya Phetchaburi, governor of Phetchaburi
 Seksun Suttijan as Khun Phadet

 Burma
 Amorathep Rimdusit as King Alaungpaya
 Ekkapong Jonggetsakorn as King Hsinbyushin, son of Alaungpaya
 Chatchawan Phetwisith as Maha Nawrahta
 Visarut Hirunbutsya as Ne Myo Thihapate
 Santi Santivetchakul as Maha Thiha Thura
 Paithon Songubol as Thong Suk, also known as Suki Phra Nai Kong

 Others
 Vittavat Singlamphong as Prince Chet of Ayutthaya
 Vorrarit Fueng-Arom as Kla
 Kakkingraks Kikkiksaranang as Luean
 Auttama Chiwanitchapan as Yuean
 Chulalak Ismalone as Yisun
 Attapol Testtawong as Phon
 Anuwat Moonkom as Tin
 Somchai Kemglad as Suea Khunthong, chief bandit
 Yothin Maphobpan as monk, master of Khan Thong

Reception

rating

References

External links 
 
 หนึ่งด้าวฟ้าเดียว : dara.trueid.net
 บทละคร หนึ่งด้าวฟ้าเดียว : MGR Online
 เรื่องย่อละคร หนึ่งด้าวฟ้าเดียว : MGR Online

2018 Thai television series debuts
2018 Thai television series endings
Thai television soap operas
Channel 3 (Thailand) original programming
Thai historical television series